is a Japanese professional basketball player who plays for the Rizing Zephyr Fukuoka of the B.League in Japan.

Career statistics

Regular season 

|-
| align="left" | 2013-14
| align="left" | Toyotsu
| 30|| 4|| 20.3|| .465|| .404|| .774|| 2.4|| 3.9|| 1.6|| 0.0|| 5.9
|-
| align="left" | 2014-15
| align="left" | Toyotsu
| 30|| 18|| 20.6|| .411||.375||.577|| 2.4|| 3.9|| 1.7|| 0.1||  6.5
|-
| align="left" | 2015-16
| align="left" | Toyotsu
| 36|| 36|| 25.6|| .401|| .342|| .671|| 3.3|| 4.9|| 1.8|| 0.1|| 8.4
|-
| align="left" | 2016–17
| align="left" | FE Nagoya
|48|| 40|| 27.1|| .418|| .283|| .734|| 3.1|| 4.5||1.6|| 0.1||  7.7
|-
| align="left" | 2017–18
| align="left" | Nishinomiya/Akita
|43 ||16 ||13.9 ||.401 ||.383 ||.757 ||1.2 || 2.6|| 0.8||0.0 ||3.7
|-
| align="left" | 2018-19
| align="left" | Nishinomiya
|41  || 0 ||13.46  ||.437  ||.302  ||.849  ||1.3  ||1.8 ||1.10 ||0.02 ||4.8
|-
| align="left" | 2019-20
| align="left" | Aomori
|46  || 4 ||16.1  ||.431  ||.345  ||.623  ||1.7  ||3.1 ||1.1 ||0.0 ||6.5
|-
|}

Playoffs 

|-
|style="text-align:left;"|2017-18
|style="text-align:left;"|Akita
| 5 || 0 || 8.50 || .318 || .250 || .400 || 1.6 || 2.0 || 0.4 || 0 || 3.6
|-

Early cup games 

|-
|style="text-align:left;"|2017
|style="text-align:left;"|Nishinomiya
| 3 || 1 || 15.49 || .250 || .000 || .750 || 1.7 || 1.0 || 1.0 || 0 || 3.0
|-
|style="text-align:left;"|2018
|style="text-align:left;"|Nishinomiya
|1 || 0 || 6.29 || .333 || .000 || .000 || 2.0 || 0 || 0 || 0 || 2.0
|-
|style="text-align:left;"|2019
|style="text-align:left;"|Aomori
|2 || 1 || 20.59 || .556 || 1.000 || .667 || 1.0 ||4.0 || 2.0 || 0 || 8.0
|-

External links

References

1990 births
Living people
Akita Northern Happinets players
Aomori Wat's players
Japanese men's basketball players
Nishinomiya Storks players
Sportspeople from Saitama Prefecture
Toyotsu Fighting Eagles Nagoya players
Point guards